Don Albert Morin (born 1954 in Hay River, Northwest Territories) was the seventh premier of the Northwest Territories, Canada.

Scandal
The initial complaints that led to the investigations by the ethics commissioner were filed with the Northwest Territories ethics commissioner by MLAs Jane Groenewegen and Jeannie Marie-Jewell. While Premier Morin was being investigated he and his lawyers tried to pressure the ethics commissioner into resigning her post.

Morin was forced to resign as Premier in 1998 after a scathing report was released over conflict of interest allegations involving the illegal shipment of government owned bison to a friend of the premier in 1996. In addition to those allegations he was also under investigation for having awarded a contract to lease to a Government of Northwest Territories Lahm Ridge Tower building to an associate.

After Morin resigned as Premier, senior cabinet minister and Deputy Premier Goo Arlooktoo automatically became acting Premier until Jim Antoine was elected. Morin served the rest of his term as a private member and retired when the legislature dissolved in 1999.

References

External links

1954 births
Living people
Premiers of the Northwest Territories
Members of the Legislative Assembly of the Northwest Territories
People from Hay River
People from Yellowknife